Palmas is a handclapping style which plays an essential role in Flamenco music. It used to help punctuate and accentuate the song and dance. Good palmas can be a substitute for music, such as in the corrillo at the end of a show. Good palmistas can assist the musicians by keeping a strong tempo, or the dancer by accentuating the end or beginning of a phrase. In any case, an understanding of palos is essential.

The hands
It is important to be able to make two distinct types of hand claps. These are hard (fuertes) and soft (sordas). Each has a particular sound and is used at a particular time.

Fuertes

Used during furious and loud footwork or during loud musical pieces such as bulerías. The first three fingers of one hand are held firm and clapped into the outstretched palm of the other. The fingers of the striking hand should point roughly in line with the fingers on the other hand and hit in the bowl of the palm. This should result in a very crisp snappy sound.

Sordas
Used during guitar intros or during the singing so as not to drown it out. Also during quieter dance phases so as not to distract the dancer. The hands are cupped softly so that the fingers of one hand fit snugly into the gap between the thumb and forefinger of the other. When the hands are brought together a muffled pop can be heard.

Accentuation in compás
During accompaniment, different emphasis may be placed on each of the beats to enhance the rhythm and indicate the start and end of the musical phrases. This is easily accomplished by clapping a little stronger on the requisite beat. As with footwork, one of the most difficult aspects is maintaining a steady pace without speeding up.

Contra-tiempo
Contra-tiempo palmas is a way of clapping between the normal beats in a bar. For instance, filling the space between beats with another beat or clap.

References 
 

Flamenco
Idiophones
Spanish musical instruments
Andalusian musical instruments